The 1921 Baylor Bears football team was an American football team that represented Baylor University as a member of the Southwest Conference (SWC) during the 1921 college football season. In its second season under head coach Frank Bridges, the team compiled an 8–3 record (2–2 against SWC opponents) and outscored opponents by a total of 214 to 83.

Schedule

References

Baylor
Baylor Bears football seasons
Baylor Bears football